Kalmar may refer to:

 Kalmar, a city in Småland, Sweden
 Kalmar, Iran, a village in Mazandaran Province, Iran
 Kalmar Airport, Sweden
 Kalmar County, Sweden
 Kalmar Municipality, Sweden
 Kalmar Union, a Scandinavian political union of the Middle Ages
 Kalmar Verkstad, a Swedish train and automobile manufacturer
 Kalmar (surname), several people

Also:
 Kalmar, a division of Cargotec manufacturing machines for ports

See also
 Calmar (disambiguation)